Alexander Macmillan may refer to:

Alexander MacMillan (publisher) (1818–1896), co-founder of Macmillan Publishers
Alexander Macmillan, 2nd Earl of Stockton (born 1943), descendant and former chairman of Macmillan Publishers
Alexander Hugh Macmillan (1877–1966), member of the Watch Tower Bible & Tract Society Board of Directors in 1918
Alexander Stirling MacMillan (1871–1955), Canadian politician in Nova Scotia
Alex McMillan (born 1932), American politician from North Carolina
Alexander McMillan (North Carolina politician) (died 1817), American politician from North Carolina
Alexander McMillan (Wisconsin pioneer) (1825–1901), American politician in Wisconsin
Alexander Macmillan (born 1927), Canadian engineer